(born December 4, 1968) is a Japanese former ski jumper.

He competed from 1988 to 2001. He won a silver medal in the team large hill competition at the 1994 Winter Olympics in Lillehammer and followed that up with a bronze medal in the team large hill competition at the 1995 FIS Nordic World Ski Championships in Thunder Bay, Ontario.

Nishikata finished in the Top 3 once in each of the four Cup World Cup seasons between 1993 and 1996.

External links
 
 

1968 births
Living people
Japanese male ski jumpers
Ski jumpers at the 1994 Winter Olympics
Olympic ski jumpers of Japan
Olympic medalists in ski jumping
People from Nagano Prefecture
FIS Nordic World Ski Championships medalists in ski jumping
Medalists at the 1994 Winter Olympics
Olympic silver medalists for Japan
20th-century Japanese people